Riverside Cemetery is a plot-holder owned Jewish cemetery with over 65,000 burials located in Saddle Brook, New Jersey, located  west of the George Washington Bridge. The cemetery maintains over 25,000 individual plantings on graves throughout the property. 

Prior to becoming a cemetery, the land was the property of Richard Romaine. Bergen County Historical Society maps indicate a main house of early Italianate design (current office), a grist mill and a saw mill on the property (the mills were removed prior to establishment of the cemetery).

Notable burials

 Meyer Berger (1898–1959) Journalist
 Abraham Jacob Bogdanove (1886–1946) Painter, educator
 Moshe Cotel (1943–2008) Composer
 Ervin Drake (1919–2015) Songwriter
 Stanley Milgram (1933–1984) Scientist
 Beatrice Pons (1906–1991) Actress
 Isidor Isaac Rabi (1898–1988) Nobel Prize in Physics Recipient
 Benjamin J. Rabin (1896–1969) U.S. Congressman

References

Cemeteries in Bergen County, New Jersey
Jewish cemeteries in New Jersey
Saddle Brook, New Jersey
1906 establishments in New Jersey